Pseudoxestia is a genus of moths of the family Noctuidae. It is now considered as a junior synonym of the genus Rusina.

References
Natural History Museum Lepidoptera genus database

Noctuinae